Kuhsorkh County is in Razavi Khorasan province, Iran. The capital of the county is the city of Rivash. At the 2006 census, the region's population (as Kuhsorkh District of Kashmar County) was 27,029 in 7,411 households. The following census in 2011 counted 26,258 people in 8,037 households. At the 2016 census, the district's population was 25,014 in 8,004 households. Kuhsorkh District was separated from Kashmar County on 9 September 2018 to become Kuhsorkh County.

Administrative divisions

The population history of Kuhsorkh County's administrative divisions over three consecutive censuses is shown in the following table.

References

 

Counties of Razavi Khorasan Province